Pogliano may refer to:

 Pogliano Milanese,  an Italian comune in Lombardy
 Pogliano, a populated placed in Moncucco Torinese, Piedmont

People 
 Cesare Pogliano, Italian footballer 
 Felix Pogliano, Argentine-American officer of the United Mine Workers of America
 Gilberto Pogliano, Italian professional football player

See also
 Pogliana
 Pugliano